Clement Francis Wedgwood (25 February 1840 – 24 January 1889) was an English businessman, a partner in the Wedgwood pottery firm.

The son of Francis Wedgwood and his wife Frances Mosley.  He was a great-grandson of the potter Josiah Wedgwood.  He married Emily Catherine Rendel, daughter of the engineer James Meadows Rendel, on 6 November 1866, and they had five sons, one of whom died in infancy:

 Francis Hamilton Wedgwood, JP, High Sheriff, (1867–1930)
 Clement Henry Wedgwood (1870–1871) died in infancy
 Josiah Clement Wedgwood, 1st Baron Wedgwood (1872–1943)
 Sir Ralph Wedgwood, 1st Baronet (1874–1956) 1st baronet, chief officer of the LNER for 16 years.
 Arthur Felix Wedgwood (1877–1917), killed during the First World War

References

1840 births
1889 deaths
Darwin–Wedgwood family